Raymond Park Apartments is a historic apartment building at the northeast corner of Hinman Avenue and Grove Street in Evanston, Illinois. The seven-story building was built in 1928; at the time, it was one of Evanston's largest residential apartments. Architects Hall, Laurence & Ratcliffe designed the building in the Tudor Revival style. The building has a brick exterior with sections of rough stone; the exterior is decorated with half-timbering and leadlight windows. The Tudor style is continued in the building's lobbies, which include strapwork, oak panels, and slate flooring.

The building was added to the National Register of Historic Places on April 12, 2002.

References

Buildings and structures on the National Register of Historic Places in Cook County, Illinois
Residential buildings on the National Register of Historic Places in Illinois
Apartment buildings in Illinois
Buildings and structures in Evanston, Illinois
Residential buildings completed in 1928
Tudor Revival architecture in Illinois